The Nikon Df is a full-frame F-mount DSLR FX format camera announced by Nikon on November 5, 2013. It uses dedicated mechanical controls similar to those used on mechanical 35mm film SLR camera and has an appearance similar to the Nikon FE and Nikon FM film cameras. Nikon's website states "Using its large, metallic mechanical dials, photographers will rediscover a more direct connection with their camera."

It has the same sensor overall score 89 of DxOMark with Nikon D4, the Nikon Df (at time of release) ranked first in a low-light test with 3279 ISO (Nikon D4 with 2965 ISO), but in practice the difference is small.

In a departure from the rest of Nikon's DSLR lineup, the Df does not record video, only still images; while most reviews were generally positive, this and other built-in limitations of the camera were seen as negatives.  Also notable by their absence were built-in flash and a variety of automatic modes, though the backward lens compatibility extends to nearly the entirety of the Nikon lineup since 1959.

Features
Same FX-format CMOS sensor and EXPEED 3 image-processing engine as the Nikon D4

References

External links

 Nikon Df, Nikon USA
 Nikon Df Manual Nikon

Df
Df
Cameras introduced in 2013
Full-frame DSLR cameras